Parliamentary elections were held in Lithuania on 11 and 25 October 2020 to elect the 141 members of the Seimas. 71 were elected in single-member constituencies using the two-round system, and the remaining 70 in a single nationwide constituency using proportional representation. The first round was held on 11 October and the second round on 25 October. 

In the context of the COVID-19 pandemic, the 2020 Lithuanian parliamentary election had the second-lowest turnout in first round elections to the Seimas since the Republic of Lithuania was restored in the early 1990s (the lowest occurred in 2004).

Electoral system

The Seimas has 141 members, elected to a four-year term in parallel voting, with 71 members elected in single-seat constituencies and 70 members elected by proportional representation. The voting in the elections is open to all citizens of Lithuania who are at least 18 years old.

Parliament members in the 71 single-seat constituencies are elected in a majority vote, with a run-off held within 15 days, if necessary. The remaining 70 seats are allocated to the participating political parties using the largest remainder method. Parties normally need to receive at least 5% (7% for multi-party electoral lists) of the votes to be eligible for a seat. Candidates take the seats allocated to their parties based on the preference lists submitted before the election and adjusted by preference votes given by the voters.

To be eligible for election, candidates must be at least 25 years old on the election day, not under allegiance to a foreign state and permanently reside in Lithuania. Persons serving or due to serve a sentence imposed by the court 65 days before the election are not eligible. Also, judges, citizens performing military service, and servicemen of professional military service and officials of statutory institutions and establishments may not stand for election. In addition, a person who has been removed from office through impeachment may not be elected.

Background 
The 2016 election was a surprise landslide victory for the Lithuanian Farmers and Greens Union (LVŽS), which won 54 seats, including half of the single-member constituencies. The Skvernelis Cabinet took office with the support of LVŽS and Social Democratic Party of Lithuania (LSDP). The latter party split in 2017 due to disagreement about government participation, with some of its MPs forming the Social Democratic Labour Party of Lithuania (LSDDP) with members of the Labour Party. Lacking support in Parliament, the government passed a cooperation agreement with Order and Justice (TT) in 2018. After the 2019 presidential election, the Order and Justice and the Electoral Action of Poles in Lithuania – Christian Families Alliance joined a coalition. Later the same year, the Order and Justice was expelled from a coalition.

A proposal to reduce the size of the Seimas from 141 to 121 seats failed following a referendum held in May 2019. In the same year, Ramūnas Karbauskis and Naglis Puteikis proposed bill, which reduced electoral threshold from 5% to 3%, but due to President of the Republic of Lithuania veto, this proposal was not implemented.

In 2020, single-member constituencies were redrawn: one constituency was added in Vilnius, one constituency was removed in Kaunas, new worldwide constituency was established and constituencies in rural areas were enlarged.

COVID-19 effects 

Due to the COVID-19 pandemic, Central Electoral Commission proposed extension on early voting (four days instead two days). In the second round special polling places for self-isolating voters were set up in Vilnius, Kaunas, Šiauliai and Raseiniai districts.

On 21 October, a few days before the second round, Lithuanian municipalities were divided into green, yellow and red "risk zones", with de facto lockdown rules, mask mandates and limits on capacities.

Parties

Politicians not standing
Irena Degutienė (TS-LKD)
Antanas Baura (LVŽS)
Viktoras Rinkevičius (LVŽS)
Bronius Bradauskas (LSDP)
Leonard Talmont (LLRA)
Gintaras Steponavičius (LRLS, independent)
Virgilijus Poderys (independent)

Opinion polls

Graphical summary

Party vote
The following are opinion polls conducted for the legislative elections, measuring estimated percentage of the vote. Highlighted parties successfully pass the electoral threshold to win national list seats.

The following are seat projections for the election:

Results

Preference votes
Alongside votes for a party, voters were able to cast a preferential votes for a candidate on the party list.

Analysis
The Homeland Union – Lithuanian Christian Democrats once again received a plurality of votes, similar to the prior elections, and achieved much more success in constituency seats, which made up most of its net gain of 19 seats. Overall Homeland Union – Lithuanian Christian Democrats received its largest share of votes and seats since 1996. All parties involved in the pre-election coalition, including the Lithuanian Farmers and Greens Union, Social Democratic Labour Party, and Electoral Action of Poles in Lithuania – Christian Families Alliance, lost seats compared to what they held prior, with the Farmers and Greens losing over 40% of their prior seats.

The Electoral Action of Poles also failed to make the 5% threshold for national list seats for the first time since 2008 (although the party's support was declining ever since 2014 European Parliament election). The Social Democratic Party lost a further four seats, achieving its worst seat result since 1992, and its worst vote result since 1996, while the new Freedom Party saw success, obtaining 11 seats less than two years after its split from the Liberal Movement. The Labour Party saw a rebound at the national level from its disappointing performance in 2016, gaining 8 seats overall and obtaining nearly 10% of the popular vote. Freedom and Justice, which was formed by a merger of Order and Justice (which received 8 seats in the 2016 elections) and the Lithuanian Freedom Union (Liberals), received one constituency seat.

Overall, the Homeland Union – Lithuanian Christian Democrats, the Liberal Movement and the Freedom Party got most support from the cities. For example, both in Vilnius and Kaunas these three parties combined won 52 per cent and 50 per cent of votes respectively.

Turnout was roughly 47% in the first round, and 39% in the second round.

In one of the single-member constituencies (51st Utena) a second round produced an equal number of recorded votes for two candidates: Edmundas Pupinis of the Homeland Union – Lithuanian Christian Democrats, and Gintautas Paluckas of the Social Democratic Party. After a recount, Pupinis was declared the winner with 7,076 votes (Paluckas received 7,071 votes). Despite this, the Social Democratic Party disputed the constituency result as the chairman of the 51st Utena single-member constituency electoral commission turned out to be a staff member of candidate Pupinis. After a recount by the Central Electoral Commission, Pupinis was again declared the winner with 7,078 votes (in this case Gintautas Paluckas received 7,072 votes).

Aftermath
As no party or electoral coalition won a majority of seats (71), a coalition had to be formed. On 15 October, four days after the first round, the leaders of the Homeland Union – Lithuanian Christian Democrats, the Liberal Movement, and the Freedom Party published a joint declaration, which stated that all three parties nominate Ingrida Šimonytė as their joint candidate to be Prime Minister of Lithuania. 

On 4 November, a second nationwide lockdown and quarantine began. Unlike during the rest of the year, the official numbers of cases and deaths rose exponentially in November and December (see COVID-19 effects).

On 9 November, a formal coalition agreement between the three aforementioned parties was announced. On 13 November, Viktorija Čmilytė-Nielsen of the Liberal Movement was elected as Speaker of the Seimas. On 24 November, Ingrida Šimonytė was appointed as Prime Minister of Lithuania.

Notes

References

Lithuania
Parliamentary election
Parliamentary elections in Lithuania
Lithuania